Meyer Carlos de Camargo, Júnior (born 29 January 1980 in São Paulo), known as just Meyer, is a Brazilian football player. He currently plays for South Melbourne FC.

Football career
He left Brazil for Al-Nasr (Salalah) of Oman in January 2003 and later returned to Brazil. In January 2006 he left again, this time to F.C. Matera of Italy. He was granted Italian passport by descent, and  left for FC Baulmes and then SR Delémont.

External links
 Brazilian FA Database

1980 births
Living people
Brazilian footballers
Brazilian expatriate footballers
Brazilian people of Italian descent
Association football defenders
Al-Nasr SC (Salalah) players
Expatriate footballers in Oman
Expatriate footballers in Italy
SR Delémont players
F.C. Matera players
Expatriate footballers in Switzerland
Footballers from São Paulo (state)
Melbourne Knights FC players
Brazilian expatriate sportspeople in Oman
Brazilian expatriate sportspeople in Italy
Brazilian expatriate sportspeople in Switzerland